The Nyker Group is a group of geological formations from the Early Cretaceous, about 146 to 140 million years ago. It is on the island of Bornholm, Denmark. It includes the  Rabekke, Robbedale and Jydegaard Formations.

Rabekke Formation 

The Rabekke Formation is the lowermost formation of the Nyker Group. It dates to about 146 to 145 million years ago, at the Jurassic-Cretaceous boundary. The formation has the significance of having the first Scandinavian mammal, Sunnyodon notleyi, uncovered from it. Many crocodilomorphs and other vertebrates have been recovered from it.

Robbedale Formation 

The Robbedale Formation is the middle formation of the Nyker Group. It dates to about 145 million years ago. No vertebrate fossils have been recovered from the formation.

Jydegaard Formation 

The Jydegaard Formation is the uppermost formation of the Nyker Group. It dates to around 145 to 140 million years ago. The first dinosaur found on Denmark, Dromaeosauroides bornholmensis, was discovered in this formation. Many vertebrates have been recovered from it.

See also 
 List of fossiliferous stratigraphic units in Denmark

References 

Geologic groups of Europe
Geologic formations of Denmark
Lower Cretaceous Series of Europe
Cretaceous Denmark
Jurassic System of Europe
Jurassic Denmark
Berriasian Stage
Tithonian Stage
Paleontology in Denmark